Ujjain–Nagda MEMU is a passenger train of the Indian Railways, which runs between Ujjain Junction railway station and Nagda Junction railway station, both within Madhya Pradesh.

Average speed and frequency

The train runs with an average speed of 39 km/h and completes 56 km in 1h 25m. The trains which runs on a daily basis.

Route and halts

The important halts of the train are:

See also

 Ujjain Junction railway station
 Nagda Junction railway station
 Dahod–Ratlam MEMU
 Vadodara–Dahod MEMU

Notes

References

External links 

 69185/Nagda–Ujjain MEMU
 69186/Ujjain–Nagda MEMU

Transport in Ujjain
Rail transport in Madhya Pradesh
Railway services introduced in 2016
Electric multiple units of India